Salona was an ancient city and the capital of the Roman province of Dalmatia. Salona is located in the modern town of Solin, next to Split, in Croatia.

Salona was founded in the 3rd century BC and was mostly destroyed in the invasions of the Avars and Slavs in the seventh century AD.

Many Roman characteristics can be seen such as walls, a forum, a theatre, an amphitheatre, public baths and an aqueduct.

History

Salona grew in the area of the Greek cities of Tragurian and Epetian on the river Jadro in the 3rd century BC. Salona is the largest archaeological park in Croatia and grew to over 60,000 inhabitants. It was the birthplace of Roman Emperor Diocletian. In the first millennium BC, the Greeks set up a marketplace. Salona had also been in the territory of the Illyrian Delmatae, before the conquest of the Romans. Salona became the capital of the Roman province of Dalmatia, because it sided with the future Roman Dictator Gaius Julius Caesar in the civil war against Pompey. Martia Iulia Valeria Salona Felix (the full name of the ancient city) was founded probably after the Roman civil wars under Julius Caesar. The early Roman city encompassed the area around the Forum and Theatre, with an entrance, the Porta Caesarea, on the north-east side. The walls were fortified with towers during the reign of Augustus. The early trapezoidal shape of the city was transformed by the eastern and western expansion of the city.

The city quickly acquired Roman characteristics: walls, a forum, a theatre, an amphitheatre which are the most conspicuous above-ground remains today, public baths, and an aqueduct. Many inscriptions in both Latin and Greek have been found both inside the walls and in the cemeteries outside, since Romans forbade burials inside the city boundaries. Several fine marbles sarcophagi from those cemeteries are now in the Archaeological Museum of Split. All this archaeological evidence attests to the city's prosperity and integration into the Roman Empire. Salona had a mint that was connected with the mint in Sirmium and gold & silver mines in the Dinaric Alps through Via Argentaria.

When the Roman Emperor Diocletian retired, he erected a monumental villa (palace) in a suburban location (6 km away). This massive structure, known as Diocletian's Palace, after Salona's fall became the core of the city of Split (Spalatum). Diocletian's tomb was reportedly also somewhere near Salona.

Salona's continuing prosperity resulted in the extensive church building in the fourth and fifth centuries, including an episcopal basilica and a neighboring church and baptistery inside the walls, and several shrines honoring martyrs outside. These have made it a major site for studying the development of Christian sacred architecture. The Salonitan bishop held the position of metropolitan bishop of Dalmatia. After the fall, bishopric and other remains were transferred to Split (see Archbishopric of Spalathon). The borders and influence of Salonitan Archdiocese included almost all of today's Croatia and Bosnia and Herzegovina south of river Sava and west of river Drina.

Salona was the only Eastern Adriatic port-city listed in Diocletian's Edict on Maximum Prices, and out of all listed port-cities it had most maritime connections (those being with Alexandria, Ephesus, Nikomedia, Seleucia Pieria, and Carthago). The connection with Ravenna was also prominent. The connections were not only about exchange of goods and monuments, prominent individuals also traveled, remained to live and die at Salona (especially from Syria). Seemingly it was a big port as for the Battle of Sena Gallica (551), Byzantine general Jon sailed from it with 38 ships (compared to Ravenna's 12).

Fall

In the early 7th century the Roman limes on river Danube and Sava fell and was militarily abandoned, leaving Roman province of Dalmatia open for conquest. The events of the fall of the city because to its location are relevant to the understanding when the province and coastal cities periphery succumbed to barbaric invasion. Pope Gregory I in July 600 wrote to the archbishop of Salona, Maximus, in which he expresses concern about the arrival of the Slavs ("de Sclavorum gente quae vobis valde imminet et affligor vehementer et conturbor"). According to Constantine VII's De Administrando Imperio (10th century) and Thomas the Archdeacon's Historia Salonitana (13th century), Salona was largely destroyed in the seventh century invasions of the Avars and Slavs (more specifically the Croats per Thomas the Archdeacon who also identified them with Goths and Slavs). In the DAI'''s chapters 29 and 30 on the history of Dalmatia and fall of Salona, the terms Avars and Slavs were interchangeably used but, most probably, generally meant the Slavs. The city was reportedly conquered by trickery when the Avar-Slavs, previously defeating at the river Danube or Sava (possibly also near Cetina) a Roman army dispatched from Salona/Klis, in disguise passed the frontier castrum of Klis and expelled the Romans from the city. When it became their possession, they "settled and thereafter began gradually to make plundering raids and destroyed the Romani who dwelt in the plains and on the higher ground and took possession of their lands". Refugees from Salona settled in other coastal and island cities (Decatera, Ragusa, Spalato, Tetrangourin, Diadora, Arbe, Vekla and Opara) and inside Diocletian's Palace.

The exact date of destruction and fall is uncertain. Pope John IV sent abbot Martin (possibly future Pope Martin I) to Dalmatia in 641 to redeem captives, which was interpreted that Salona must have been destroyed before that date. As Salona's refugees are also said by Thomas the Archdeacon to have founded Ragusa around 625 it meant that Salona had to be destroyed around 625 or before. In the scholarship, it was traditionally dated to 614, although opinions varied between 608 and 639. The last dated inscription, reflecting existence of life in the city, in the ruins is dated to 12 May 612. However, 1970s were found many coins, out of which few were of Heraclius and youngest minted in 630/631. It is interpreted as evidence that the city was rather becoming steadily abandoned after 614 and probably destroyed in 639. Some other archaeological excavations probably show a small group of people continued to live with newcomers until mid-7th century when it became abandoned. Tibor Živković argued that the attack happened in the early 630s and became abandoned after that time.

The new Slavic population settled outside the ruins to the East near river Jadro, where are found Old-Croat graves. In the 10th and 11th century Croatian kings founded and rebuilt three churches, one of which was used as a royal mausoleum (with found sarcophagus of Croatian Queen Helen of Zadar); in another, Demetrius Zvonimir was crowned king of Croatia. The archaeologically confirmed information is found in Historia Salonitana''.

Architecture
Various town structures have been excavated.

Manastirine 
These are the remnants of the Basilica and cemetery outside of the town. The earliest parts of the complex date back to the second century BC. The bishop and martyr Domnio was buried here after being executed in the arena of the amphitheater on 304AD.

At the end of the fourth century, the complex was partly destroyed during the German incursions, and in the mid-fifth century, a three-nave basilica was constructed on top of the ruins. Many sarcophagi can be found here. in the early seventh century, the  cemetery was looted and partly destroyed.

The cemetery exhibits a feature of Christian cemeteries at that time to have deceased buried as close as possible to the martyr or Ad sanctos.

Tusculum 
Architectural and ornamental fragments, capitals inscriptions, and columns from the area were replaced in a building built in 1898. It was restored in 2008.

City walls

The construction of the Salonitan city walls took several centuries. The earliest part of the city was surrounded by walls as early as the second century BC. During the Pax Romana the city expanded to both east and west.

During the reign of Emperor Marcus Aurelius around 170 A.D., under the constant threat of Germanic tribes, the east and west suburbs were included in the walls, which were fortified with at least 90 towers. Some parts of existing buildings were used in the extensions to the walls, thus making them integral.

During the reign of Emperor Theodosius II in the early fifth century, all the towers were reconstructed, as witnessed by an inscription on the walls. Furthermore, in the first half of the sixth century, triangular-shaped endings were added to some square-shaped towers to improve the city's security and defense system. Such examples are visible today on the northern side of the Urbs orientalis.

Episcopal center 
The center of Christian Salona is in the northwest part of the eastern city. Here is an Episcopal center with twin lengthways basilicas, a baptistery, and Bishop's Palace were built in the fifth century A.D. 

This Basilica is the largest in the entire area of Dalmatia. The best-preserved part of the oldest part of the city (Urbs vetus) is the eastern wall and Porta Caesarea with two octagonal towers and three passages; one for cart traffic and two for pedestrians on each side of the wider passage. The central passage was probably equipped with a movable grid, as indicated by grooves on side pylons.

Aqueduct 

Emperor Augustus built an aqueduct to supply the city with water from the river Jadro. Calculations show that the aqueduct could supply enough water for about 40,000 people.

Thermae

The thermae were typical buildings of Roman civilization and an indispensable part of Roman urban life. Although the city of Salona had multiple baths, the best-preserved and largest ones are those in the eastern part of the city called the Great Thermae, built in the second or beginning of the third century A.D. This building is rectangular, with three symmetrically arranged apses in the north and one in the west. There was an adjoining elongated spacious room to the north, housing a semicircular pool, the piscina, filled with cold water, the frigidarium. There were two dressing rooms to the left, with benches for sitting and openings in the wall for clothes. The room to the west was also used as a massage room, the unctorium. The room ending with an apse served both as a lounge and an exercise room. To the right there were hot baths and sauna: caldarium, tepidarium and sudatorium.

Bridge of Five Arches
In the eastern suburb of Salona, five arches spanned the westernmost backwater of the river Jadro. The bridge carried one extension of Decumanus Maximus which branched into two roads, one of which led north-east to the Porta Andetria gate, while the other one led across the bridge to Epetium, today's city of Stobreč.

Porta Caesarea 
The Porta Caesarea is a well-preserved gate with two octagonal towers and three passages, one for cart traffic and two for pedestrians on each side of the wider passage. The central passage was probably equipped with a movable grid, as indicated by grooves on side pylons. Porta Caesarea was constructed using large regular stones primarily for fortification purposes. After eastern and western expansion had occurred, the gate lost its primary purpose and became carrying construction of the aqueduct. According to Kähler's reconstruction, the gate had two floors, of which the top one was very elaborately decorated with half columns, composite capitals, and window openings. Within the gate, there was a small courtyard for defense purposes.

Praetorium 
Southeast of the ports Caesarea, a luxurious villa has been uncovered, which was probably the palace of the Roman governor of Dalmatia.   Several mosaics depicting mythological figures such as Apollo Orpheus and Triton I've been transferred to the archaeological museum in Split.

Forum 
The center of the town's public life was in the southeast part of the old town. After the fourth century A.D., as the town became more Christian, the forum started to lose its role as the city center.

Theatre 
A theater  in size was built in the first century A.D.

Temple 
South of the theater, there is a temple that was dedicated to either Dionysus or Liber.

Kapljuc 
These ruins are the remnants of the oldest cemetery basilica. It was built in the middle of the fourth century above the graves of four Praetorian guards who were executed in the arena during Diocletian's persecution of Christians.

Amphitheatre

At the westernmost point of Salona, in the second half of the second century A.D., under the influence of Flavian architectural style, a monumental building was erected.  The presence of a Roman amphitheater indicates that gladiator fights were held in the city of Salona until the fifth century, when they were finally banned. The building was ellipsoidal in shape, with three floors on the south side and one floor on the north side, conveniently laid down on a natural hillside. Despite its relatively small size ( outer shell and  the arena), the Salonitan amphitheater could have been occupied by 15,000 up to 18,000 spectators. The auditorium was divided into three tiers, the lower two with seats and the upper one for standing. In Diocletian's time, the top tier was covered with a porch. Through poles attached to the outer shell of the building, the whole arena could be covered with canvas, giving protection from the sun and rain. There was a state box for the Province governor on the south side and opposite it seats of honor for the city magistrates. In the center of the arena, an opening led into an underground corridor whose purpose was the disposal of dead gladiators' bodies. On the south side of the amphitheater, beneath the auditorium, there were two vaulted rooms where gladiators worshipped Nemesis, the goddess of revenge and destiny. During Diocletian's persecutions of Christians, the amphitheater was used as a site of executions.

Only parts of substructures of this monumental building, as well as some fragments of architectural decoration and stone sculpture, have been preserved. The amphitheater was most severely damaged during the wars against the Turks in the 17th century when Venetians had it demolished for strategic reasons.

Marusinac 
This cemetery complex has the martyr Anastasios thrown into the bay with the grindstone around his neck in 304 AD. The mausoleum was built in the early fourth century. In the fifth and sixth centuries, other bishops and priests were buried here.

Gradina 
Gradina means a medieval hill fort built on the east walls by the Turks after capturing Klis.

City necropolises 

 Burying the dead inside the city was against Roman law, so Romans buried their dead on the roads leading out of the city.

References

Further reading

 
 

Former populated places in the Balkans
Illyrian Croatia
Archaeology of Illyria
Greek colonies in Illyria
Byzantine Dalmatia
Tourist attractions in Split-Dalmatia County
Archaeological sites in Croatia
Roman towns and cities in Croatia